Epermenia pseudofuscomaculata is a moth of the family Epermeniidae. It is endemic to Kyushu, Japan.

As the species name suggests, it is similar to Epermenia fuscomaculata, but the forewings are a little darker, especially on the apical area. The fasciae are reddish brown.

Etymology
The specific name refers to the similarity to Epermenia fuscomaculata.

References

External links

Moths described in 2006
Endemic fauna of Japan
Epermeniidae
Moths of Japan